Case House was a historic home located at Parkersburg, Wood County, West Virginia, United States.  It was built about 1901, and was a 2½-story brick dwelling in the Queen Anne style.  It features a three-story, polygonal corner tower and a multigabled roof.

It was listed on the National Register of Historic Places in 1982. It has since been demolished or moved.

References

Demolished buildings and structures in West Virginia
Houses on the National Register of Historic Places in West Virginia
Queen Anne architecture in West Virginia
Houses completed in 1901
Houses in Parkersburg, West Virginia
National Register of Historic Places in Wood County, West Virginia